The 2003–04 Illinois State Redbirds men's basketball team represented Illinois State University during the 2003–04 NCAA Division I men's basketball season. The Redbirds, led by first year head coach Porter Moser, played their home games at Redbird Arena and competed as a member of the Missouri Valley Conference.

They finished the season 10–19, 4–14 in conference play to finish in tenth place. They were the number ten seed for the Missouri Valley Conference tournament. They were victorious over Bradley University in their opening round game but were defeated by the University of Northern Iowa in their quarterfinal game.

Roster

Schedule

|-
!colspan=9 style=|Regular Season

|-
!colspan=9 style=|State FarmMissouri Valley Conference {MVC} tournament

References

Illinois State Redbirds men's basketball seasons
Illinois State
Illinois State Redbirds men's
Illinois State Redbirds men's